SS Lurline may refer to one of the following Matson Navigation Company ships:

 , later Alaska Packers Association ship Chirikof, served as USAT Chirikof during World War II
 , ocean liner
 , the former SS Monterey; named Lurline, 1963–1970
 , container ship

Ship names